The 1720s decade ran from January 1, 1720, to December 31, 1729.

References